Josephine Langford (born 18 August 1997) is an Australian actress. She is best known for her starring role as Tessa Young in the After film series. She also portrayed Emma Cunningham in the Netflix film Moxie while also portraying Zoey in upcoming Netflix romcom The Other Zoey and Katy Gibson in Gigi & Nate.

Early life
Langford was born in Perth, Western Australia, and raised in Applecross, a riverside suburb of Perth. She is the youngest daughter of Stephen Langford, a flying doctor and the director of medical services at the Royal Flying Doctor Service Western Operations, and Elizabeth Green, a pediatrician. Her older sister, Katherine Langford, is also an actress.

As a child, Langford became interested in music and played the saxophone, the violin, and the piano. She's also played cricket in her childhood. In 2008, at the age of 10, Langford wrote and performed a song called "Shadows" for a music competition, which won her the "Song of the Year" title. She also wrote two more songs, "Lonely" (2007) and "Sea Shanty" (2008).

Career
Langford started taking acting classes at the age of 13. In 2012, she began taking acting classes at Perth Film School. At the age of 14, she began appearing in several short films such as Sex Ed (2013), When Separating (2013), and Gypsy Blood (2014). She made her screen debut in the indie film Pulse (2017), which screened at film festivals. She also starred as a supporting actress the same year on the American horror film Wish Upon, acting alongside Joey King. She also made her television debut in 2017 on the Australian series Wolf Creek.

In July 2018, Langford was cast as Tessa Young in the film After, based on the 2014 new adult fiction novel of the same name written by Anna Todd. The film premiered in 2019, and grossed $69.7 million worldwide. She won a Teen Choice Award for her role as Tessa. Josephine Langford reprised role in the sequel, After We Collided, which was released in September 2020. In 2019, Langford also appeared in the American horror anthology web television series Into the Dark as Clair.
In November 2019, Langford was cast as Emma Cunningham in the Netflix film Moxie, which is based on the novel of the same name written by Jennifer Mathieu.

Filmography

Awards and nominations

References

External links
 
 Josephine Langford Instagram

1997 births
21st-century Australian actresses
Actresses from Perth, Western Australia
Australian film actresses
Australian television actresses
Living people
People educated at All Saints' College, Perth